Durobong is a mountain in the province of Gangwon-do in South Korea. Its area extends across Pyeongchang County, Hongcheon County  and the city of Gangneung.

See also
List of mountains in Korea

Notes

References

Mountains of Gangwon Province, South Korea
Pyeongchang County
Hongcheon County
Gangneung
Mountains of South Korea
One-thousanders of South Korea